Shane Monro Kirkwood (born 6 September 1989) is a South African professional rugby union player for Bourgoin in the Fédérale 1 in France. He regularly plays as a lock.

Career

Golden Lions / UJ

Kirkwood was selected to represent the Golden Lions at the 2007 Under-18 Craven Week tournament held in Stellenbosch. Later in the same year, he was also included in the  squad that played in the Under-19 Provincial Championship, a competition in which he also played, in 2008.

He came on as a substitute after 54 minutes and took just 13 minutes to score his first senior try, scoring one of five tries in a 34–47 defeat. In the second half of the year, he represented the s in the 2009 Under-21 Provincial Championship, as he did in 2010 without featuring again at first class level.

Kirkwood also joined university side  for the 2011 Varsity Cup competition. He quickly established himself as a key player for UJ, playing in seven of their eight matches in the competition as they reached the semi-finals. Eight appearances and two tries followed in the 2012 Varsity Cup and he started all eight of their matches in the 2013 Varsity Cup, helping UJ reach the semi-finals on both occasions. He played in all seven of their matches in the 2014 Varsity Cup, where a disappointing season resulted them having to beat  in a relegation play-off match to retain their Varsity Cup status.

Falcons

After the 2013 Varsity Cup, Kirkwood once again became involved at provincial level, joining the Golden Lions' near-neighbours, Kempton Park-based side , for the 2013 Currie Cup First Division season. The match ended in a 30-all draw, but Kirkwood's debut was marred by a yellow card he received in the 12th minute of the match. He made a total of nine starts during their campaign as the Falcons disappointingly finished bottom of the log.

Despite missing part of the 2014 Vodacom Cup season due to his involvement in the Varsity Cup, Kirkwood made three appearances in the competition and also scored a try in his only start of the campaign, a 34–64 loss to eventual champions . The Falcons then participated in the 2014 Currie Cup qualification competition; the winner of the competition would qualify to the 2014 Currie Cup Premier Division, but the Falcons finished in sixth position to remain in the 2014 Currie Cup First Division.

References

South African rugby union players
Living people
1989 births
People from Alberton, Gauteng
Rugby union locks
Falcons (rugby union) players
Rugby union players from Gauteng
Golden Lions players
CS Bourgoin-Jallieu players
Pumas (Currie Cup) players